Dharma Yuddam is a 1979 Indian Tamil-language action film directed by R. C. Sakthi. It stars Rajinikanth and Sridevi. The film was released on 29 June 1979.

Trivia:

This film was a major hit and is credited for establishing Rajinikanth as one of the most sought after leading men in Tamil Cinema.

Plot 

Vijay's parents are killed by Robert. He is adopted and brought up by Thiyagarajan. After many years Vijay finds out that Robert has been stealing body parts, especially eyes. How Vijay takes revenge on him forms the crux of the story.

Cast 
Rajinikanth as Vijay
Sridevi as Chitra
 Manorama
Thengai Srinivasan as Robert
Major Sundarrajan as Thiyagarajan
Suruli Rajan as Vijay's friend
S. A. Ashokan as Azhagappan
V. Gopalakrishnan as Dr. Amarnath
Sachu as Geetha
Pushpalatha as Chitra's mother
 S. R. Veeraraghavan as Ramanathan
 Jaggu as Henchman
 Lakshmi Sree as Manju
 Master Chandrasekar as Child vijay
Y. G. Mahendra (Guest appearance)
Idichapuli Selvaraj
Chakkaravarthi

Soundtrack 
The soundtrack was composed by Ilaiyaraaja.

References

External links 
 

1970s Tamil-language films
1979 films
Films directed by R. C. Sakthi
Films scored by Ilaiyaraaja
Indian action films